The Abbot of Lindores (later Commendator of Lindores) was the head of the Tironensian monastic community and lands of Lindores Abbey in Fife (the nearby town of Newburgh was created by and belonged to the abbey). The position was created when the abbey was founded some time between 1190 and 1191 by King William the Lion's brother Prince David, Earl of Huntingdon, and Lord of Garioch. The following is a list of abbots and commendators. 


List of abbots
 Guy, 1191-1219
 John, 1219-1244
 Thomas, 1259-1273
 John, 1273-1274
 Nicholas, 1274-1282
 John, 1287-1291
 Thomas, 1296
 Andrew de Lenna, x 1306
 William, 1306x1307
 Adam, 1331-1344x1346
 William, 1358-1363
 Roger, 1370-1380
 John Steele, 1380 x 1381-1383 x 1390
 William de Angus, 1380-1395
 John Steele (again), fl. 1402-1421
 James de Rossy, 1425-1451
 John Ramsay, 1457-1474
 Andrew Cavers, 1475-1502
 Henry Orme, 1502-1528
 John Philp, 1523-1566

List of commendators
 John Lesley, 1566-1568
 Patrick Leslie of Pitcairlie, 1st Lord Lindores, 1569-1600

Notes

Bibliography
 Watt, D.E.R., Fasti Ecclesiae Scotinanae Medii Aevi ad annum 1638, 2nd Draft, (St Andrews, 1969), p. 69-70
 Watt, D.E.R. & Shead, N.F. (eds.), The Heads of Religious Houses in Scotland from the 12th to the 16th Centuries, The Scottish Records Society, New Series, Volume 24, (Edinburgh, 2001), p. 136-39

See also
 Lindores Abbey

History of Fife
People associated with Fife
Scottish abbots
Tironensians
Lists of abbots